John Warnaby is a British actor who has appeared extensively in film and television.

Career

In 1996, Warnaby appeared at the National Theatre in Helen Edmundson's adaptation of Leo Tolstoy's War and Peace. In 2006, he appeared in The Line of Beauty. In Nicholas de Jongh's 2009 stage hit in London Plague Over England, Warnaby plays both 1950s Home Secretary David Maxwell Fyfe and an acerbic theatre critic.

Filmography

References

British male television actors
Living people
Year of birth missing (living people)
People educated at St Philip's School
People from Birmingham, West Midlands